San Juan, officially the City of San Juan, is a 1st class highly urbanized city in the National Capital Region of the Philippines. According to the 2020 census, it has a population of 126,347 people. It is geographically located at Metro Manila's approximate center and is also the country's smallest city in terms of land area.

The city is known historically for the site of the first battle of the Katipunan, the organization which led the 1896 Philippine Revolution against the Spanish Empire. Notable landmarks today such as Pinaglabanan Shrine and heritage homes are located in the city. Other locations include Greenhills and Santolan Town Plaza, making the city a major shopping hub with a range of upscale, boutique and bargain retail.

Etymology
"San Juan" is a contraction of the city's traditional name of "San Juan del Monte". As with numerous other places in the Philippines, the name combines a patron saint and a toponym; in this case Saint John the Baptist with the locale's hilly terrain and relatively higher elevation compared to surrounding areas.

The city's official name is "Dakilang Lungsód ng San Juan".

History

Pre-colonial and colonial era
During the pre-Hispanic period, the area of what is now San Juan was a part of the Kingdom of Namayan, whose last recorded rulers were King Lacantagean and his consort, Bouan. In the late 16th century, the kingdom and other polities in the islands were absorbed into the Spanish Crown, with the realm of Namayan christened as the parish of Santa Ana de Sapa. (present-day Santa Ana, Manila) The present area of San Juan was meanwhile re-classified as the small encomienda (town) of San Juan del Monte in 1590.

In 1602, along the Camino de Mandaluyong (now F. Blumentritt Street), the Dominican Order built a novitiate house in the town for their immediate use, where ageing or convalescing friars stayed. Within the area, the Dominicians also constructed a convent and a stone church, the Santuario del Santo Cristo, dedicating it to the Holy Cross. To this day, the thrice-rebuilt church stands on the same site, adjacent to Aquinas School and Dominican College.

Given the isolation that the town had from the city of Manila, the colonial government decided to establish a heavily fortified gunpowder magazine called the Almacén de Pólvora (also known as El Polvorín) in San Juan del Monte in 1771. The gunpowder magazine (located at present-day San Juan Elementary School) was situated along the banks of the Salapang River (now known as Salapán Creek), with access provided by the Camino de Mariquina (now N. Domingo Street), which connected Manila and the nearby barrio of Santa Mesa across the San Juan River Bridge to the pueblo of Mariquina (now Marikina).

Municipality established
In 1783, San Juan del Monte was promoted to a municipality, separating it from the Santa Ana Parish and giving it its own local government as a barrio of the Province of Manila. As a result, the old poblacion at Santuario del Santo Cristo was moved to the Camino de Mariquina, where a new municipal hall and a town plaza (now the San Juan Plaza Mayor) was constructed.

In 1892, Father Bernardino Nozaleda, the Archbishop of Manila, approved the creation of a new parish for the municipality of San Juan del Monte, with the Franciscans establishing the San Juan Bautista Church (now Pinaglabanan Church) and a parochial house in the area now known as Pinaglabanan Street.

Philippine Revolution

When the Philippine Revolution against Spain broke out in August 1896, the Katipunan revolutionaries led by Andrés Bonifacio and his aide Emilio Jacinto made their way from Pugad Lawin in Kalookan (now Caloocan, part of Quezon City) to attack the El Polvorín and its military garrison in San Juan del Monte on the morning of August 30, 1896. Defended by a hundred Spanish troops consisting of infantry and artillery, the Katipuneros were able to eliminate the garrison commander and an artilleryman, forcing the remaining Spanish troops to retreat to the nearby El Deposito water reservoir near the San Juan Bautista Church. Sustaining heavy losses, the Katipuneros were unable to capture El Polvorín, and retreated south towards Mandaluyong, where Bonifacio reorganized the surviving Katipuneros and issued a war manifesto, leading Katipuneros in other places to organize Filipinos to rise up in arms against the colonial government as revolts spread all across the archipelago.

Outbreak of the Philippine-American War

Following the end of the Philippine Revolution and the Treaty of Paris in 1898 that seceded the Philippines to the United States, the First Philippine Republic that succeeded the Katipunan distrusted the occupying American forces that were arriving in droves, with both sides wanting to engage in combat. On the morning of February 4, 1899, Filipino troops from the 4th Company of the Morong Battalion under Captain Serapio Narvaez were fired upon by American troops of the 1st Nebraska Infantry Regiment from their defense line on the Santa Mesa side (now part of Sampaloc).

The first shot was exchanged by Private William W. Grayson, an American sentry from the 1st Nebraska Infantry Regiment of the United States Volunteer Army, who killed Filipino corporal Anastacio Felix and another Filipino soldier of the Philippine Revolutionary Army, firing the first shot of the Philippine–American War. This prompted lines of Filipino troops in San Juan del Monte to open fire at the line of American troops in Santa Mesa. The first shot was previously believed to have been exchanged at the San Juan River Bridge until studies by Filipino historian Benito J. Legarda concluded that the shot was not fired at the bridge, but was instead fired at what is now the corner of Sociego Street and Silencio Street in Santa Mesa.

Throughout the war, the Oregon Regiment of the United States Volunteer Army carried out multiple skirmishes against militias and soldiers of the First Philippine Republic in towns along the Camino de Mariquina, where they had cleared out Filipino forces at the El Deposito reservoir, its pumping station road (now Pinaglabanan Street, part of Santolan Road), and the santuario.

As a result of the war, many of the original residents of San Juan del Monte evacuated en masse, permanently settling in neighboring towns. This led to many lots becoming abandoned, causing a local malaria epidemic with many casualties.

American colonial era
Following the end of the Philippine-American War, the Dominicans returned to the municipality to establish their ownership of the Santo Cristo hacienda before the new American colonial government. As a result, much of San Juan del Monte was being leased to the municipal government by Dominican hacienda owners until it was eventually purchased by the municipal government.

In 1901, the municipality was incorporated into the new Province of Rizal through Act No. 137, with former Katipunan San Juan chapter sanggunian Andres Soriano serving as its first municipal president. In 1903, it was merged into the municipality of San Felipe Neri (present-day Mandaluyong) through Act No. 942 of the Taft Commission. In 1907, San Juan del Monte was reconstituted as an independent municipality through Act No. 1625,

In 1916, the municipal government purchased the land along the intersection of N. Domingo and F. Blumentritt Streets, where the town market (present-day Agora Market) was located. Likewise, in 1919, businessmen Eusebio Orense and Florencio G. Diaz purchased a great bulk of the remaining hacienda lands, selling it to a Filipino-American consortium developing the San Juan Heights, a series of new subdivision developments all across the area. It was around this time that the municipality's name was contracted to San Juan. Between 1939 to 1941, the barrios of Cubao, Diliman, and San Francisco, as well as Camp Crame, were ceded from San Juan to the newly established Quezon City.

On January 1, 1942, San Juan was one of the municipalities of Rizal merged alongside Manila and Quezon City to form the City of Greater Manila as an emergency measure by President Manuel L. Quezon. It became a municipality of Rizal once again when the City of Greater Manila was dissolved by President Sergio Osmeña effective August 1, 1945.

Martial law era

San Juan, especially its exclusive subdivisions in Greenhills, was home to many prominent personalities during the country's Martial Law era under President Ferdinand Marcos. This included several Armed Forces of the Philippines generals, including Romeo Espino, Alfredo Montoya, and Romeo Gatan, who would later be tagged as members of the "Rolex 12"; Imelda Marcos’ secretary Fe Jimenez Roa; Presidential Assistant on Legal Affairs Ronaldo Zamora, who would later become a congressman for the lone congressional district of San Juan; San Juan Mayor Joseph Estrada, who would later become President of the Philippines; and prominent journalist Maximo Soliven, who was imprisoned when President Marcos first declared Martial Law in September 1972.

Incorporation into Metro Manila
When Presidential Decree No. 824 establishing the National Capital Region was signed on November 7, 1975, San Juan was among the towns excised from Rizal Province into the newly created metropolitan area.

People Power Revolution

Club Filipino, which had relocated to San Juan in 1970 from its original location in Santa Mesa, became an important part of the establishment of the Fifth Philippine Republic when President Corazon Aquino was inaugurated there on February 25, 1986, the last day of the civilian-led 1986 People Power Revolution.

Contemporary era
In 1992, San Juan had the least number of informal settler families out of all the municipalities and cities in Metro Manila based on data from the National Housing Authority.

Cityhood

Residents ratified the conversion of the municipality into a highly urbanized city on June 17, 2007, pursuant to Republic Act No. 9388 ("An Act Converting the Municipality of San Juan into a Highly Urbanized City to be known as the City of San Juan"). Then-Representative  Ronaldo Zamora sponsored the Cityhood Bill in the House of Representatives and worked for its approval.

Presidential ties
Although not officially designated as such, San Juan is noted to be the "City of Philippine Presidents." Four presidents since the Third Republic were official residents of San Juan when they assumed office. They were the Macapagal père et fille, Diosdado (1961–1965) and Gloria Macapagal Arroyo (2001–2010); Ferdinand Marcos (1965–1986); and Joseph Estrada (1998–2001), who also served as Mayor when San Juan was still a municipality.

Geography
San Juan is the least-extensive city in the Philippines with a total area of just .

San Juan is bounded by Quezon City on the north and east, Mandaluyong on the south, and the City of Manila in the west.

The territory of San Juan was once much larger than it is now, extending all the way to what is now Caloocan. Parts of the present-day Districts 1, 4 and 6 of Quezon City as well as areas of Mandaluyong were originally within the town's colonial-era borders. This also explains why San Juan Reservoir is in nearby Horseshoe Village, a subdivision now part of Quezon City.

Climate

Barangays

San Juan is politically subdivided and comprises into 21 barangays organized into two congressional districts:

{{PH brgy table lite|top|2=heavy
|3= District
|4= Date of Fiesta 
}}
|

| style="text-align:center;" | 2 || style="text-align:center;" data-sort-value="" | June 24

| style="text-align:center;" | 1 || style="text-align:center;" data-sort-value="" | Tuesday before Ash Wednesday

| style="text-align:center;" | 1 || style="text-align:center;" data-sort-value="" | June 24

| style="text-align:center;" | 1 || style="text-align:center;" data-sort-value="" | June 8

| style="text-align:center;" | 1 || style="text-align:center;" data-sort-value="" | June 24

| style="text-align:center;" | 2 || style="text-align:center;" data-sort-value="" | June 24

| style="text-align:center;" | 2 || style="text-align:center;" data-sort-value="" | September 14

| style="text-align:center;" | 2 || style="text-align:center;" data-sort-value="" | May 3

| style="text-align:center;" | 2 || style="text-align:center;" data-sort-value="" | May 1,Second Sunday of May

| style="text-align:center;" | 2 || style="text-align:center;" data-sort-value="" | Last Sunday of January

| style="text-align:center;" | 2 || style="text-align:center;" data-sort-value="" | November 30

| style="text-align:center;" | 1 || style="text-align:center;" data-sort-value="" | May 14–15

| style="text-align:center;" | 1 || style="text-align:center;" data-sort-value="" | December 12

| style="text-align:center;" | 1 || style="text-align:center;" data-sort-value="" | July 25

| style="text-align:center;" | 1 || style="text-align:center;" data-sort-value="" | Third Sunday of October

| style="text-align:center;" | 2 || style="text-align:center;" data-sort-value="" | March 19

| style="text-align:center;" | 1 || style="text-align:center;" data-sort-value="" | August 15

| style="text-align:center;" | 1 || style="text-align:center;" data-sort-value="" | January 18

| style="text-align:center;" | 2 || style="text-align:center;" data-sort-value="" | Second Sunday of December

| style="text-align:center;" | 2 || style="text-align:center;" data-sort-value="" | June 24

| style="text-align:center;" | 2 || style="text-align:center;" data-sort-value="" | December 8

Demographics

Religion

The city also has several notable places of worship. Saint John the Baptist Parish, more commonly known as "Pinaglabanan Church", is where the city's patron saint, John the Baptist, is enshrined. The Santuario del Santo Cristo is the settlement's oldest existing church, while Mary the Queen Parish in West Greenhills serves the local Filipino-Chinese community.

From 1925 to 1971, the Iglesia ni Cristo once headquartered in the town at its former Central Office Complex, now known as the Locale of F. Manalo. It features Art-Deco designed ensembles, crafted by National Artist for Architecture Juan Nakpil. The chapel is the centerpiece of the Complex, which also contains the old Central Office and Pastoral House which was the home of the church's first Executive Minister, Ka Felix Manalo, along with other Ministers and Evangelical Workers. When Manalo died in 1963, a mausoleum was constructed on the grounds of the Complex by architect Carlos Santos-Viola.

San Juan also has a number of Evangelical churches. Through the APOI (Association of Pastors for Outreach and Intercession), they have contributed to the spiritual atmosphere of the city. Every January, the city celebrates the National Bible Week, where the reading of the Scripture happens during the flag raising ceremony in the City Hall. Through the blessing of the mayor, a bible was planted in the heart of the new city hall during its construction. Major evangelical churches like Jesus is Lord and Victory Greenhills are also found in the city of San Juan.

San Juan is also home to two Islamic mosques, namely: Masjid Hamza Bin Ahmed in Balong-Bato and Greenhills Masjid at Greenhills Shopping Center.

Economy
 
The Greenhills Shopping Center is the hub of trade and commerce in San Juan. The shopping complex housed shopping malls, the Virra Mall, Shoppesville, Greenhills Theater Mall, Promenade Mall, the former Greenhills Bowling Alley, and Unimart.

Culture

Wattah! Wattah! Festival

Since 2003, San Juan City celebrates the feast of its patron saint, St. John the Baptist every June 24 with its Wattah Wattah Festival, a festival with dancing, parades, and its traditional basaan or water dousing along the city streets. The festival and its activities are usually held along N. Domingo Street and Pinaglabanan Street as the procession of the image of St. John the Baptist goes down the streets.

San Juan City Ordinance No. 51 series of 2018 prohibits dirty water, ice, water in glass bottles, and water or ice in other materials that will incite pain or injury upon impact from being used in the festival. Physical violence, inciting of threats, and deliberately entering public transport vehicles to douse commuters is also not allowed.

However, in 2020 and 2021, due to the COVID-19 pandemic, the festival was reduced to a parade of the image of St. John the Baptist with social distancing and mask mandates in place. In 2022, due to a lower number of COVID-19 cases, the traditional basaan was included again in the Wattah! Wattah! Festival, accompanied by a street dancing competition, a free concert, and a fireworks display.

Transportation

Modes of public transportation in San Juan include jeepneys and buses. Jeepney routes ply the Aurora Boulevard (R-6). The city is serviced by J. Ruiz station of the LRT Line 2 in the city proper and indirectly served by Santolan-Annapolis station of the MRT Line 3, at the city's eastern boundary with Quezon City.
The C-3 (Araneta Avenue) also passes through San Juan. Secondary routes include Nicanor Domingo (abbreviated N. Domingo), which heads towards Cubao in Quezon City, and Pinaglabanan Street (which continues as Santolan Road) leading towards Ortigas Avenue and eventually the southern reaches of Quezon City near Camp Crame, the headquarters of the Philippine National Police.

Education

The Schools Divisions Office (SDO) of San Juan City oversees 9 public elementary schools, 2 public high schools, and a science high school within the city. The SDO also recognizes 24 private schools in San Juan City, seven of which are preschools, four of which are elementary schools, and 13 of which are high schools.

Public higher education is offered by the state Polytechnic University of the Philippines, which maintains its San Juan campus in Barangay Addition Hills. Private higher education is offered by the Dominican College in Barangay Tibagan, one of the oldest schools in the city, having been established in 1924.

The city also has two culinary schools, namely the Center for Asian Culinary Studies in Barangay Pasadena and the Istituto Culinario in Barangay Greenhills.

Notable personalities

Alfred Vargas, actor and Quezon City 5th district councilor
Bongbong Marcos, 17th President of the Philippines, former senator, former Ilocos Norte governor, and former representative of Ilocos Norte 2nd District
Chris Tiu, TV host and basketball player
Don Allado, basketball player and coach, San Juan councilor
Edu Manzano, former Makati vice mayor, actor and former US Military officer
Eraño Manalo, Iglesia ni Cristo Executive Minister (1963–2009)
Ferdinand Marcos, 10th President of the Philippines, 3rd Prime Minister of the Philippines, 11th President of the Senate of the Philippines, former representative of Ilocos Norte 2nd District
Francis Zamora, former San Juan Vice Mayor and incumbent San Juan Mayor (since 2019)
Franklin Drilon, senator
Gabby Concepcion, actor, singer, businessman
Grace Poe, senator and former MTRCB chairperson
Imee Marcos, senator, former Ilocos Norte 2nd District representative
Irene Marcos, daughter of Ferdinand Marcos Sr. and Imelda Marcos
Imelda Marcos, former First Lady and former Governor of Metro Manila
Jake Ejercito, actor
James Yap, basketball player, San Juan councilor
Janella Salvador, actress singer artist
Jaymee Joaquin, former TV host
Jinggoy Estrada, senator, former San Juan Mayor, and actor
Joross Gamboa, actor
Joseph Estrada, 13th President of the Philippines, 9th Vice President of the Philippines, 26th Mayor of Manila, 14th San Juan Mayor, actor
JV Ejercito, senator, former San Juan Mayor
Ericka Villongco, singer and actress
Krissy Villongco, singer
Luis Manzano, actor and TV host
Max Soliven, journalist, newspaper publisher, founder of The Philippine Star
Ophelia Dimalanta, poet, editor, author, and teacher
Paul Artadi, basketball player and San Juan District 1 councilor
Philip Cezar, PBA Player aka "Tapal King", San Juan vice mayor (1992-2001), and current basketball coach
Ronaldo Zamora, former congressman of lone district of San Juan and San Juan–Mandaluyong
Teofisto Guingona Jr., 11th Vice President of the Philippines
Yasmien Kurdi, actress

Sister cities

Local
Davao City
Iloilo City

International
 Coquitlam, British Columbia, Canada
 San Juan, Puerto Rico, United States
 Maui, Hawaii, United States
 Santa Barbara, California, United States

Gallery

References

External links

[ Philippine Standard Geographic Code]

 
Cities in Metro Manila
1623 establishments in the Philippines
Highly urbanized cities in the Philippines
Populated places established in 1623